HRT 1 (HTV 1, "Prvi program") is the first Croatian television channel, operated by Hrvatska Radiotelevizija. It is a generalist channel, whose diverse programming lineup includes documentaries, history, school, mosaics, news, sitcoms, movies, talk-shows, and game-shows.

Current line-up

Children Show 

 Alma's Way
 Rosie's Rules

News shows
 Dobro jutro, Hrvatska - TV breakfast in 06:00
Dnevnik - main news in 19:00
Vijesti - news, runs in 7:00, 8:00, 9:00, 12:00, 16:30, 22:45

Entertainment 
 TV Bingo (national lottery show)
 The Voice Hrvatska (singing show)
 Tko želi biti milijunaš? (game show)
 Potjera (game show)

Documentary/talk shows
 Nedjeljom u dva - talk show
 Otvoreno - political night talk show

Telenovelas
 Voli me zauvijek - A que no me dejas

Sports
 UEFA Europa League
 UEFA Europa Conference League

Previously on HRT1
 Kolo sreće - Wheel of Fortune
 Motrišta
 Odjeci dana
 Izazov! - Jeopardy!
 Art Attack - children's art show
 Najslabija karika - The Weakest Link
 1 protiv 100 - 1 vs 100
Dossier.Hr - news/politics magazine
 Latinica - political Monday talk show
 Res Publica - educational talk show
 New Talk Show - new talk show in autumn
 Lica nacije - political Tuesday night talk show
 Hrvatski kraljevi - documentary about Croatian kings and dukes
 Strictly Come Dancing - Ples sa zvijezdama (dancing reality)
 Just The Two of Us - Zvijezde pjevaju (singing reality)
 U istom loncu (cooking show)
 Friday night (variety show)

Croatian soap operasSve će biti dobro (Everything will be fine)Dolina sunca (Sun valley)Ponos Ratkajevih (The pride of the Ratkaj family)Obični ljudi (Common people)Ljubav u zaleđu (Love in offside)Villa Maria Mućke (Only Fools and Horses)
 Stipe u gostima (Stipe in guests)
 Odmori se zaslužio si (Relax, you deserve it)
 Naši i vaši (Ours and Yours)

Foreign Series
 Pat i Mat - Pat & MatSeinfeld - Seinfeld
 Simpsoni - The Simpsons
 The Oprah Winfrey Show - talk show
 The Dr. Oz Show'' - talk show
 House M.D. - in Croatian "Dr House"
 The X-Files - in Croatian "Dosjei X"
 ER - in Croatian "Hitna služba"
 The Scent of Rain in the Balkans - in Croatian "Miris kiše na Balkanu"

Logo History

See also

Hrvatska Radiotelevizija

References

External links
Official Site

Television channels in Croatia
Television channels in North Macedonia
Television channels and stations established in 1956
Croatian-language television stations